Throckmorton High School is a public high school located in Throckmorton, Texas (USA) and classified as a 1A school by the UIL. It is part of the Throckmorton Collegiate Independent School District (formerly "Throckmorton Independent School District") located in central Throckmorton County. In 2015, the school was rated "Met Standard" by the Texas Education Agency.

Athletics
The Throckmorton Greyhounds compete in these sports - 

Basketball
Cross Country
6-Man Football
Golf
Tennis
Track and Field

State Titles
Football - 
2005(6M), 2011(6M/D1), 2012(6M/D1), 2014(6M/D2)
Boys Golf - 
1977(B), 1978(B), 1979(B), 1980(B), 1985(1A), 2002(1A), 2006(1A), 2015(1A)
Girls Golf - 
2003(1A)
One Act Play - 
1982(1A)

State Finalists
Football - 
1986(1A), 2010(6M/D1)

Band
Marching Band State Champions^ 
2003(1A)
^were co-champions with Sundown High School

Notable people
 Bob Lilly, a Pro Football Hall of Fame defensive tackle for the Dallas Cowboys (1961–74), attended THS through his junior year. Because of the 1950s drought, his family moved to Pendleton, Oregon, where went to Pendleton High School for his senior year. Lilly returned to Texas in 1957 and played college football at TCU in Fort Worth.
 Pete Stout, former NFL fullback / linebacker

References

External links
Throckmorton ISD
Max Preps – Throckmorton Greyhounds
List of Six-man football stadiums in Texas

Public high schools in Texas